Four male athletes from Venezuela competed at the 1996 Summer Paralympics in Atlanta, United States.

See also
Venezuela at the Paralympics
Venezuela at the 1996 Summer Olympics

References 

Nations at the 1996 Summer Paralympics
1996
Summer Paralympics